Peter Soriano (born 1959) is a contemporary artist and sculptor. His works are included in the collections of the Museum of Fine Arts, Boston, the Portland Museum of Art and the Colby College Museum of Art in Maine, the Morgan Library & Museum in New York, the Harvard Art Museums at Harvard University, the Fonds national d'art contemporain (FNAC) in Paris, the Fondation Cartier pour l'Art Contemporain, and the Wanås Foundation in Sweden.

Life 

Soriano was born in 1959 in Manila, in the Philippines, where his grandfather Andrés Soriano was a prominent industrialist and war hero. He moved to the United States in the 1970s. He has studios in Penobscot, Maine, Paris, France, and New York City, where he and his wife, Nina Munk, own a townhouse.
Soriano has a BA in history of art from Harvard College, and also studied at the Skowhegan School of Painting and Sculpture. He has said that he learned painting from his uncle Fernando Zóbel de Ayala y Montojo.

Work 

In the 1990s Soriano made large biomorphic sculptures in polyester resin. While his earliest works seemed light-hearted and reminiscent of children's toys, his later sculptures became more “vexing,” to cite a critic, suggestive of industrial tools with an indeterminate purpose.

In the mid-2000s, during a six-month residency at the Atelier Calder in Saché, in Indre-et-Loire in France, he started making wall installations using aluminium tubing, steel cable, and spray paint. The critic Raphael Rubinstein, an editor at Art in America, mentioned these works as examples of what he calls "provisional painting", a style of art intentionally made to appear "casual, dashed-off, tentative, unfinished or self-cancelling." Beginning in 2012, his work became dominated by large-scale, wall drawings made of graphite, acrylic and spray paint, carried out on the basis of written instructions, as well as related drawings made on pleated Japanese paper. “Simply put, Soriano has become a sculptor who doesn’t make objects,” wrote the poet and art critic John Yau.

More recently, Soriano has been working on a long-term project that, according to a museum press release, "documents the rapidly changing natural environment of the High North, specifically snow, glaciers, and icebergs." In 2022, one work in this project, a 28-foot-long wall drawing titled Ilulissat, Disko Bugt, a reference to the location in Greenland where the artist used "an almost scientific process of observation and documentation" to capture to impermanence of icebergs, was installed and exhibited first at the Portland Museum of Art and then at the Reykjavik Art Museum.

Selected exhibitions 

 Running Fix, Fonds régional d’art contemperain Auvergne, Clermont-Ferrand, France, February 2007;
Other Side -> (NUM)BERS <- And What Follows, Brittany, France, September 2011;
Bagaduce ->( )<- East 19th, Center for Maine Contemporary Art, Rockport, ME, May 2013;
Permanent Maintenance, Colby College Museum of Art, Waterville, ME, September 2015;
Cresta, CIRCUIT Centre d'art contemporain, Lausanne, Switzerland, September 2017;
INAGDV, L’art dans les chapelles, Le Sourn, France, July 2018.
 Down North: North Atlantic Triennial, Portland Museum of Art, Portland, ME, February 2022; 
 Down Иorth, Reykjavik Art Museum, Reykjavik, Iceland, October 2022;

References

1959 births
Living people
Harvard College alumni
Skowhegan School of Painting and Sculpture alumni
20th-century American sculptors
French sculptors
21st-century American sculptors